John Wilkins Whitfield (March 11, 1818 – October 27, 1879) was a territorial delegate to the United States Congress representing the Kansas Territory from 1854 until 1856. He was an officer in the Confederate Army during the American Civil War, being commissioned as a brigadier general on May 9, 1863.

Biography
Whitfield was born in Franklin, Williamson County, Tennessee. He served in the Mexican–American War as a lieutenant colonel in 1846. He moved to Independence, Missouri, in 1853 to serve as Indian agent to the Pottawatomies at Westport, Missouri, and to the Arkansas Indians in 1855 and 1856.

Upon the admission of the Territory of Kansas to representation Whitfield was elected as a Democrat to the Thirty-third Congress and served from December 20, 1854, to March 3, 1855. He was then presented credentials as a delegate-elect to the Thirty-fourth Congress having seemingly won the election and served from March 4, 1855, to August 1, 1856, when the seat was declared vacant on the grounds that "the people of the Territory of Kansas have been deprived of the power to make a strictly legal election of a Delegate by an invasion from Missouri, which subverted their Territorial government and annihilated its legislative power." He was again elected to the Thirty-fourth Congress to fill the vacancy caused by the action of the House of Representatives in declaring the seat vacant. This seat was also contested and though the  Committee on Elections recommended that Whitfield again be declared not entitled to the seat because non-residents voted and that many actual Kansans were disenfranchised, the full house narrowly decided to table the resolution. Whitfield served provisionally from December 9, 1856, to March 3, 1857. He then retired from congress and became the register of the land office at Doniphan, Kansas, 1857–1861.

Whitfield served as captain of the 27th Texas Cavalry Regiment at the start of the civil war in 1861, commanded the unit as Colonel in 1862 and was promoted to the rank of brigadier general in 1863.

He settled in Lavaca County, Texas, after the war and engaged in agricultural pursuits and stock raising and served in the Texas House of Representatives. He died in Hallettsville, Texas, in 1879, where he is buried.

See also

 List of American Civil War generals (Confederate)

Notes

References
 Retrieved on 2008-02-13
 Eicher, John H., and David J. Eicher, Civil War High Commands. Stanford: Stanford University Press, 2001. .
 Political Graveyard web site bio
 Sifakis, Stewart. Who Was Who in the Civil War. New York: Facts On File, 1988. .
 Warner, Ezra J. Generals in Gray: Lives of the Confederate Commanders. Baton Rouge: Louisiana State University Press, 1959. .

|-

1818 births
1879 deaths
19th-century American politicians
American military personnel of the Mexican–American War
Delegates to the United States House of Representatives from Kansas Territory
Confederate States Army brigadier generals
Kansas Democrats
Members of the Texas House of Representatives
Members of the United States House of Representatives removed by contest
Military personnel from Texas
People from Franklin, Tennessee
People from Hallettsville, Texas
People of Texas in the American Civil War
Texas Democrats